Mongolia is a modern state in east-central Asia.

Mongolia may also refer to:

Places
Mongolia, Ontario, Canada
Greater Mongolia (disambiguation), the contiguous geographical area in which the Mongols primarily live
Inner Mongolia, an autonomous region of China south of the Mongolian state
Outer Mongolia, an outer region of the Qing dynasty, most of which is now covered by the Mongolian state (1691–1911)

Historical periods or states
Mongol Empire (1206-1368)
Mongolia under Yuan rule (1271–1368)
Mongolia under Qing rule (1635–1911)
Bogd Khanate of Mongolia (1911–1919, 1921–1924)
Occupation of Mongolia (1919–1921)
Mongolian People's Republic (1924–1992)

Ship
SS Mongolia (1903)

See also
Greater Mongolia (disambiguation)
Mongols (disambiguation)